Nagurskoye (also written as Nagurskaja)  is an airfield in Alexandra Land in Arkhangelsk Oblast, Russia located  north of Murmansk. It is an extremely remote Arctic base and Russia's northernmost military base. The base is named after Polish-Russian pilot Jan Nagórski.

Nagurskoye was built in the 1950s as a staging base for Soviet Long Range Aviation bombers to reach the US, and was maintained by the Russian Air Force agency OGA (Arctic Control Group), which maintained all Arctic bomber staging facilities.  An An-72 (Coaler) cargo plane crashed here on 23 December 1996 while attempting to land, one of the northernmost plane crashes ever. The airfield is operational, maintained by Frontier Guards (FSB) and capable of servicing An-26 and An-72 aircraft. Il-76 cargo aircraft can land at each of the two unsurfaced runways and have been carrying supplies, equipment and personnel.

Satellite photographs from September 2015 show a new base without armored vehicles or air defenses. Instead, the base consists of a central structure, several supporting structures such as fuel depots and heating installations, old and new runways, as well as anchorages that allow for the delivery of construction materials and supplies.

The runway expansion can support permanent deployments of combat jets to Moscow's most northerly base. Deploying interceptors, maritime strike fighters, airborne early warning and maritime patrol aircraft at Nagurskoye would give Russia a significant military edge in the Arctic; while refuelling long-range bombers there would noticeably extend their range.

Based units 
According to the Georgian Foundation for Strategic and International Studies, an aviation commandant's office exists at the base.  Three other units are also based on the island surrounding the base.

References

Russian Air Force bases
Soviet Air Force bases
Populated places of Arctic Russia
Franz Josef Land
Airports in Arkhangelsk Oblast